Swimming was one of the sports at the quadrennial Goodwill Games competition. Swimming competitions were held at every one of the five Goodwill Games. The final swimming events were held at the Games in 2001 as the 2005 edition of the Games were cancelled.

Editions

See also
List of Goodwill Games records in swimming

External links
Past games from the official website

 
Sports at the Goodwill Games
Goodwill Games